Andrzej Stanisław Kostka Załuski (2 December 1695 – 16 December 1758) was a priest (bishop) in the Polish–Lithuanian Commonwealth.

In his religious career he held the posts of abbot and later Bishop of Płock (from 1723), bishop of Łuck (1736), Bishop of Chełmno (1739) and Bishop of Cracow (1746).  He was a supporter of the Jesuits in Poland.

A member of the Polish nobility (szlachta) of the Junosza coat of arms, he also held the position of the Great Crown Chancellor from 1735 to 1746. As a politician he was engaged in the movement that wanted to reform the failing political system of the Commonwealth.

He studied in Danzig and Rome.

Załuski was a corresponding member of Societas eruditorum incognitorum in terris Austriacis, the first learned society in Habsuburg Austria.

He is perhaps most famous as co-founder (together with his brother Józef Andrzej Załuski, bishop of Kiev) of Załuski Library, one of the largest 18th-century collections of books in the world. He also sponsored the seminary in Pułtusk.

See also
 History of philosophy in Poland

Footnotes

References
 Piotr Nitecki, Biskupi Kościoła w Polsce w latach 965–1999 (Church Bishops in Poland from 965 to 1999), Instytut Wydawniczy Pax, Warszawa 2000

External links
 Works by Andrzej Stanisław Załuski in digital library Polona

Ecclesiastical senators of the Polish–Lithuanian Commonwealth
1695 births
1758 deaths
Bishops of Kraków
18th-century Polish nobility
18th-century Roman Catholic bishops in the Polish–Lithuanian Commonwealth
Bishops of Płock
Canons of Kraków
Abbots of Czerwińsk
Polish book and manuscript collectors
Burials at Wawel Cathedral
Bibliophiles
Abbots of Płock
Polish Hebraists
18th-century Polish–Lithuanian philosophers
Polish Enlightenment